Taiki Aerospace Research Field is a facility of the Japan Aerospace Exploration Agency.

It is used, among other things, for scientific balloon launches.  Rocket launch pad of Interstellar Technologies (IST) resides next to the field.

In April 2021, a plan to expand the park to form  was announced.  The launch pad currently used by IST for the sounding rockets is called Launch Complex-0.  Launch Complex-1, the new launch pad for orbital launch is planned to be available in JFY2023, and another pad Launch Complex-2 is planned in JFY2025.  The current 1000-meter runway is planned to be extended to 1300 m, and also possibility of new 3000 m runway in future.

References

External links
 Taiki Aerospace Research Field, JAXA
 大樹町多目的航空公園, Taiki Town. 
 Hokkaido Spaceport

Space program of Japan
Space technology research institutes